Aurora Chamorro i Gual (11 June 1954 – 17 October 2020) was a Spanish swimmer, top in her specialities between 1968 and 1974 in Spain.

Trained at the CN Poble Nou, she specialized in freestyle and butterfly speed trials, being the great Spanish dominator of the 1970s. She was champion of Catalonia on thirty occasions, among them, eleven titles in the 100 m butterfly and seven in 100 m freestyle. At the Spanish Championships, she won twenty-eight titles, excelling in the 100 m butterfly, 100 m freestyle, 4x100 m freestyle relay and 4x100 m medley relay. She also broke fourteen records in Catalonia and ten in Spain between 1969 and 1972. International with the Spanish swimming team on thirty-nine occasions, she participated in the 1970 European Aquatics Championships, the 1973 World Aquatics Championships and the 1972 Summer Olympics in Munich.

References

External links
 

1954 births
2020 deaths
Olympic swimmers of Spain
Swimmers at the 1972 Summer Olympics
Swimmers from Barcelona
Spanish female butterfly swimmers